Thara Kalyan (born 1 November 1967) is an Indian classical dancer and actress in Malayalam cinema. She has acted in mainstream Malayalam films, telefilms and television serials. She is also a professional dancer in Bharatanatyam, Mohiniyattam, and Kuchipudi.She is a 'A top' Mohiniyattam artist of Doordarshan.

She is the first among the creative Mohiniyattam dancers to have incorporated famous poems as subject and themes for her performances like Amma (O. N. V. Kurup), Karuna (Kumaran Asan), Bhoothappaattu, Yashodhara, Anarkali has been some of her appreciated works in Mohiniyattam.  Her recent work is of Thaathri Kutty which is first ever in the history of Mohiniyattam to portray the iron lady who was bold enough to raise her voice rebelling against the chauvenits. She is successfully running a dance institution in Trivandrum.

Personal life
Thara Kalyan was born in a Kerala Iyer family to Kalyanakrishnan and Subbalakshmi, a supporting actresses in Malayalam film industry. Her husband, Rajaram was also a supporting actor who played minor roles in television serials, and was a city local TV channel programme editor & local stage show choreographer .

Filmography

 as an actress
Jamalinte Punchiri
Kabeerinte Divasangal 
Next Token Number 
August 27
Run Kalyani (2022) as
Lucifer (2019) as Local guardian
Thattumpurath Achuthan (2018) as Nirmala
Nithyahairtha Kamukan (2018)
Thanaha (2018) as Subhadrakutty
Sukhamano Daveede (2018) as Daveed's mother
Pokkiri Simon (2017) as Sree
 Ezra (2017) as Priya's mother
 Kuttikalundu Sookshikkuka (2016)
 Kattappanayile Rithwik Roshan (2016) as Neethu's relative
 Lord Livingstone 7000 Kandi (2015) as Ananthu's sister
 Ivan Maryadaraman (2015) as Rajalekshmi
 Avarude Veedu 
 Haram (2015) as Isha's mother 
 Alif (2015) as Hajiyar's wife
 Angels (2014) as  Dr.Sandra Mary
 Parankimala  (2014) as Narayani
 Pranayakatha (2014) as Reetha's mother
 Rose Guitarinaal  (2013) as Joe Alex's mother
 Caribbeans (2013) as Collector Meera Devi
 Thiruvambadi Thamban (2012) as Kanakambal
 Thaskara Lahala  (2010) as Doctor
 Ammanilavu (2010) 
 April Fool (2010) as Malathi
 Ringtone (2010) as Ammini
 Puthiya Mukham  (2009) as Anjana's aunt
 Meghatheertham (2009) as Compere 
 Thirakkatha (2008) as Dr. Vasanthi
 Rappakal (2005) as Urmila
 Perumazhakkalam  (2004)
 Uthara (2003) as Muthulakshmi
 Januvariyil Pookkunna Rosa (Television movie) - Producer only
 Yudham (2002)  (Telefilm)
 Stop Violence  (2002) as Adv.Pauly 
 Nizhalkkuthu (2002) as Madhavy
 Jeevan Masai (2001) as Vipinan's wife
 Mukha Chithram (1991) 
 Nayanangal (1989) 
 Marikkunnilla Njan (1988) as Ammini
 Sukhamo Devi (1986) 
 Amme Bhagavathi (1986) as Chottanikkara Devi

 as a choreographer 
 Mayilpeelikkavu (1998) 
 Rishivamsham (1999)

TV serials

Play
 Mughaavaranam
 Kayangal

TV Shows

 DD Montage (DD Malayalam)
 Snehitha (Amrita TV)
 Onnum Onnum Monnu (Mazhavil Manorama)
 2 Crore Apple Mega Star (Jeevan TV)
 Patturumal (Kairali TV)
 Shubhadhinam (Kairali TV)
 Pularkkalam (Jeevan TV)
 Nammal Thammil (Asianet)
 Tharodayam New Face Hunt (Asianet)
Tamaar pataar (Flowers Tv)
JB Junction (Kairali TV)
Chaya Koppayile Kodumkattu (Mazhavil Manorama)
Annies Kitchen (Amrita TV)
Comedy Stars (Asianet)
Smart Show (Flowers Tv)
Katturumbu (Flowers Tv)
Laughing Villa Season 2 (Surya TV)
Sreshtabharatham (Amrita TV)
Aram + Arama = Kinnaram (Surya TV)
Red Carpet (Amrita TV)
Panam Tharum Padam (Mazhavil Manorama)
Star Comedy Magic  (Flowers Tv)

References

External links
 

Bharatanatyam exponents
Mohiniyattam exponents
Kuchipudi exponents
Living people
21st-century Indian actresses
Indian television actresses
Indian film actresses
Place of birth missing (living people)
1965 births
Actresses from Thrissur
Dancers from Kerala
Indian female classical dancers
Performers of Indian classical dance
20th-century Indian dancers
20th-century Indian women artists
Women artists from Kerala
Kerala State Television Award winners
Actresses in Malayalam cinema
Actresses in Malayalam television
Indian women television presenters